First Capital Bank Zambia Limited, is a commercial bank in Zambia that is licensed by the Bank of Zambia, the central bank and national banking regulator. It is a subsidiary of FMBCapital Holdings Plc, a financial services conglomerate, based in Mauritius, whose shares of stock are listed on the Malawi Stock Exchange and has subsidiaries in Botswana, Malawi, Mozambique, Zambia and Zimbabwe.

Location
The headquarters of the bank and its main branch, are located at the Ground Floor, Kwacha Pension House, Plot. 4604, Tito Road, in Lusaka, Zambia's capital city. The geographical coordinates of the bank's headquarters are:15°24'55.0"S, 28°17'47.0"E (Latitude:-15.415278; Longitude:28.296389).

Overview
First Capital Bank Zambia Limited is a retail bank that focuses on meeting the banking needs of small and medium enterprises in Zambia. As of December 2018, the bank's total assets were ZMW:1.2 trillion (US$65 million), with shareholders' equity of 
ZMW:155,734,064 (US$8.5 million). At that time, the bank served almost 8,700 customers at 7 branches an 7 ATMs and employed 118 staff members.

History
The bank was established in 2010 as International Commercial Bank Zambia. In 2013, First Merchant Bank successfully acquired the subsidiaries of International Commercial Bank in Malawi, Mozambique and Zambia. Although the banking business of ICB Malawi was not viable, FMB would be able to enter into the other two countries through the acquisition.

In December 2017, First Capital Bank Zambia became a subsidiary of First Merchant Bank Capital Holdings Plc, of Mauritius, whose shares trade on the Malawi Stock Exchange (MSE), under the symbol: FMBCH

In December 2019, First Capital Bank Zambia received a four-year loan worth US$10 million from the Netherlands Development Finance Company (FMO), for onward lending to SMEs in Zambia.

Ownership
The First Capital Bank Group maintains a 49 percent shareholding in First Capital Bank Zambia Limited.

Branches
The bank's headquarters are located at: Ground Floor, Kwacha Pension House, Plot. 4604, Tito Road, Lusaka, Zambia. The bank maintains brick-and-mortar branches as these locations:

 Kamwala Branch: Plot. 228, Chilibulu Road, Lusaka
 Kitwe Branch: Ground Floor, Mudzi House, Plot. 189, Kanyanta Avenue, Kitwe
 KPTF Branch: Ground Floor, Kwacha Pension House, Plot. 4604, Tito Road, Lusaka
 Cairo Road Branch: Plot. 10460, Cairo Road at Malasha Road, Northend, Lusaka
 Industrial Area Branch: Shop Number 1, Stand Number 8357, Radian Park, Ground Floor, Building Number 1, Industrial Area, Lusaka
 Makeni Branch: Stand Number 26592C, Kafue Road, Makeni, Lusaka
 Ndola Branch: Shop Number 1, Rekay Shopping Mall, Plot. 10068, President Avenue, Building Number 1, Ndola
 Chinika Agency: Plot No 8087 Export Trading Company Building Katanga Road Chinika, Heavy Industrial Area

Governance
Mark O’Donnell is the chairman and Hitesh Anadkat is the vice chairman of the eight-person board of directors. Edward Marks serves as the chief executive officer of the bank.

See also
 List of banks in Zambia
 List of companies of Zambia
 Economy of Zambia

References

External links
 Official Website

Banks of Zambia
Lusaka
Banks established in 2010
2010 establishments in Zambia
FMBCapital Holdings Plc